Henrik Møller (born 3 September 1985 in Fredericia) is a former motorcycle speedway rider from Denmark and speedway manager.

Career
He was a member of Denmark team that won the bronze medal at both the 2005 Team Speedway Junior World Championship and 2006 Team Speedway Junior World Championship.

In 2006, he signed for the Edinburgh Monarchs for the 2006 Premier League speedway season achieving a 6.57 average. He signed for Oxford Cheetahs in the 2007 Elite League speedway season but following Oxford's withdrawal from the league he rode for Birmingham and Edinburgh.

His final season in Great Britain was riding for Peterborough Panthers for the 2008 Elite League speedway season.

He rode the majority of his speedway in his native country of Denmark for the Holsted Tigers, where he won six championships in the Danish Speedway League. On his return to the club in 2014 he won yet another league title with them.

In 2019, Moller became the assistant coach of the Danish national team, where he teamed up with Hans Nielsen).

Career details

World Championships 
 Individual U-21 World Championship (Under-21 World Championship)
 2006 -  Terenzano - 10th place (6 pts)
 Team U-21 World Championship (Under-21 Speedway World Cup)
 2005 -  Pardubice - 3rd place (7 pts)
 2006 -  Rybnik - 3rd place (7 pts)

European Championships 

 Individual European Championship
 2005 -  Lonigo - 14th place (3 pts)
 2007 -  Wiener Neustadt - 17th place (0 pts)
 Individual U-19 European Championship
 2004 -  Rybnik - 6th place (8 pts)

See also 
 Denmark national speedway team

References 

1985 births
Living people
Danish speedway riders
Birmingham Brummies riders
Edinburgh Monarchs riders
Oxford Cheetahs riders
Peterborough Panthers riders
People from Fredericia
Sportspeople from the Region of Southern Denmark